Chromium(II) sulfide is an inorganic compound of chromium and sulfur with the chemical formula CrS. The compound forms black hexagonal crystals, insoluble in water.

Synthesis
Chromium(II) sulfide may be formed by reaction of chromium metal with sulfur or hydrogen sulfide at high temperature. It may also be formed by reacting chromium(III) chloride with H2S, reducing chromium(III) sulfide with hydrogen, or by double replacement reaction of lithium sulfide with chromium(II) chloride.
Cr + S -> CrS
Cr + H2S -> CrS + H2   
2CrCl3 + 3H2S -> 2CrS + S + 6HCl 
Cr2S3 + H2 -> 2CrS + H2S
Li2S + CrCl2 -> 2LiCl + CrS

Physical properties
Chromium(II) sulfide forms black paramagnetic crystals of two crystalline modifications:
α-CrS, superstructured phase, hexagonal system, cell parameters a = 1.200 nm, c = 1.152 nm.
β-CrS, monoclinic system, cell parameters a = 0.594 nm, b = 0.341 nm, c = 0.563 nm, β = 91.73°.

Chromium(II) sulfide is a semiconductor, and is also used as a catalyst.

Chemical properties
Chromium(II) sulfide slowly oxidizes in air:
2CrS + 7O2 -> 2Cr2O3 + 4SO2

References

Chromium(II) compounds
Sulfides